Lingson Belekanyama (died 12 January 2021) was a Malawian politician who served as Minister of Local Government and Rural Development.

He died of COVID-19 during the COVID-19 pandemic in Malawi.

References

Date of birth missing
2021 deaths
Government ministers of Malawi
Deaths from the COVID-19 pandemic in Malawi